Holly Rowe (born June 16, 1966) is an American sports telecaster currently working for the sports television network ESPN. Rowe is best known as a sideline reporter for college football and basketball games which are telecast on ESPN. Rowe made Utah Jazz team history on October 22, 2021 as the team’s first female color commentator in a game against the Sacramento Kings.

Early life and career 
After graduating from Woods Cross High School in Woods Cross, Utah in 1984, Rowe attended Brigham Young University. At BYU, she was the news anchor for the campus TV station, KBYU-TV. Although Rowe attended BYU for two years, she did not graduate. During this period, she also spent time as a sportswriter for the Daily Utah Chronicle and the Davis County Clipper. She later returned to school and earned a broadcast journalism degree in 1991 from the University of Utah. Right after college (1991–1992), she interned at CBS Sports.

Broadcasting career

ESPN 
Rowe has been with ESPN since August 1998 as a full-time college football sideline reporter. In that capacity, she has been a part of numerous regular season games and post-season bowl games.

Before working full-time as a college football sideline reporter, she served as a part-time sideline reporter in certain ESPN broadcasts during the course of 1997. (Prior to that, with ABC Sports, in both 1995 and 1996.)

With ESPN, Rowe has also been a part of broadcasting women's college basketball games, and women's college volleyball (both since 1998; generally in a play-by-play capacity as opposed to her college football sideline duties). Other broadcasts that Rowe has been a part of during her time at ESPN include play-by-play for Women's World Cup matches, coverage of the Running of the Bulls, coverage of swimming, and broadcasts of track and field events.

Being a woman in the sports broadcasting industry, Rowe has been profiled by other media and news organizations.

She is the lead sideline reporter for ESPN's coverage of Saturday-night college football (including the College Football Playoff), women's college basketball (including the NCAA Division I women's basketball tournament), the WNBA and playoffs, the Women's College World Series and NCAA Division I women's volleyball tournament, and also works on men's college basketball and NBA.

Other work 
Before and during her time with ESPN, Rowe has worked with several other broadcast organizations. Rowe has been a broadcaster for women's college basketball games broadcast by Fox Sports since she started in 1993. Rowe also worked as an analyst for the WNBA’s Utah Starzz.
The Blue & White Sports Network in Provo, Utah employs Rowe in many of their broadcasts, and is the network which syndicates several Western Athletic Conference (WAC) sporting events. In addition, she has held a position on the team at CBS which produces the men's Final Four. Rowe joined the Utah Jazz broadcast team in 2021 as an analyst.

References

External links 
 
Rowe ESPN bio
Daily Oklahoman article on Rowe
Videos of Holly Rowe while broadcasting

1966 births
Living people
American television sports announcers
Arena football announcers
ArenaBowl broadcasters
College basketball announcers in the United States
College football announcers
National Football League announcers
Softball announcers
University of Utah alumni
Volleyball commentators
Women sports announcers
Women's college basketball announcers in the United States
Women's National Basketball Association announcers
American women sportswriters